The style of the Scottish sovereign refers to the styles and forms of address used by Scottish royalty, specifically the monarchs of Scotland from the earliest times until the present, including monarchs from the Pictish period to the British period.

Earliest styles

Examples of the earliest styles are primarily found in sources originating from Ireland. For the earlier medieval period, Annals of Ulster (AU) and Annals of Tigernach (AT) derive from the Iona Chronicle, a chronicle kept in Scotland. The Annals of Innisfallen are not as reliable, and the forms given in that source, when in doubt, do not need to be trusted. Other sources used here are the Annals of Connacht (AC) and the Chronicon Scotorum (CS) The style almost always King's name, followed by patronymic, followed by title. The source of each style is given in brackets, followed by the year under which it follows (s.a. = sub anno); it is usually the year in which the king died. Until the eleventh century, there is no one fixed term for Scotland in Gaelic. Before tenth century, the kings the area now comprising modern Scotland are either "of Picts", "of Fortriu" or "of Alba", standardising after 900; but the rulers of Moray, not by historiographical tradition called "King", are called king in the sources; moreover, they are sometimes called "kings of Alba".

Traditional Pictish period
 Domangurt mac Nissi ri Alban (AT506)
 Comgall mac Domanguirt ri Alban (AT537)
 Gabrain maic Domanguirt ríg Alban (AT559)
 Cindaeladh rex Pictorum (AT578)
 Cennalath, rex Pictorum (AU, s.a. 580)
 Bruidhe mac Maelchon, ri Cruithneach (AT, s.a. 581)
 Bruide mc. Maelcon regis Pictorum (AU584)
 Bridei mac Maelchon, Ard Rig Toí (ACC)
 Ceannath K. of the Picts (AClon580)
 Garnat King of the Picts (AClon590)
 Gartnaidh regis Pictorum (AT597)
 Aedhain m. Gabrain mc. Domangairt righ Alban (AU606)
 Ægþan Scotta cyng (ASC603)
 Echdach Buidhe, regis Pictorum, filii Aedain (AU629)
 Conid Cerr, rex Dal Riati (AU629)
 Cinedon filii Lugthreni, regis Pictorum (AU631)
 Cined mac Luchtren, rex Pictorum (CS631)
 Cenay mc Lachtren king of the Picts (AClon632)
 Cinaed, rí Alban (AI 633)
 Cínaetha maic Luchtren, regis Pictorum (AT633)
 Octlarge m c Fogith K. of Picts (AClon649)
 Tolairg m. Fooith regis Pictorum (AU653)
 Tolairg mac Foóith regis Pictorum (AT653)
 Tolorchan mc Anfrith K. of the Picts (AClon653)
 Tolargain mc. Anfrith regis Pictorum (AU657)
 Tolorcan mac Ainfrith, rí Cruithne (AT656)
 Gartnait maic Domnaill, rig Cruithneach (AT663)
 Gartnayt son of Donall king of Picts (AClon659)
 Bruidhe mac Bile, rex Fortrend (AT693)
 Bruide m. Bili, rex Fortrend (AU693)
 Brude mac Derilei, ri Cruithintuathi (697 Cáin Adomnáin)
 Neactain reigis Pictorum (AT724)
 Drust regem Pictorum (AU729)
 Aongas, rí Foirtreann (FA?729)
 Drust, righ Alban (FA?729)
 Aengus mac Fergusa, rex Picctorum (AT736)
 Oengus m. Fergusso, rex Pictorum (AU736)
 Owinus rex píctorum (ACamb~741)
 Talargan rex pictorum (ACamb~750)
 Aengus rí Alban (AT759)
 Aengus mac Fergusa, rex Pictorum (AT761)
 Oengus m. Fherghussa rex Pictorum (AU761)
 Bruidhi rí Fortrenn (AT763)
 Bruide, rex Fortrenn (AU763)
 Cinadhon regis Pictorum (AU775)
 Cemoid rex pictorum (ACamb~775)
 Dub Tholargg rex Pictorum citra Monoth (AU782)
 Causantín mac Fergussa, ri Alban (AI820)
 Custantin m. Fergusa, rex Fortreinn (AU820)
 Oengus m. Fergusa, rex Fortrenn (AU834)
 Eoganán mac Oengusa rí Dáil Riatai (CGG)
 Cináed mac Alpín, ri Alban (AI858)
 Cinaedh m. Ailpin rex Pictorum (AU858)
 Ceínod rex pictorum (ACamb~858)

Traditional Scottish period
 Constantin mac Cinaeda ardri Alban (CGG)
 Domnall m. Caustantin, ri Alban (AU 900)
 Custantin m. Aedha ri Alban (AU 952)
 Mael Coluim m. Domnaill, ri Alban (AU 954)
 Dub m. Mael Coluim, ri Alban (AU 967)
 Culen m. Illuilb, ri Alban (AU 971)
 Amhlaim m. Ailuilbh, .i. ri Alban (AU 977)
 Amlaim mac Illuilb, rí Alban (AT 977)
 Cinaedh m. Mael Cholaim, ri Alban (AU 995)
 Cináeth mac Mail Cholaim, rí Alban (AT 995)
 Constantin mac Cuilindaín rí Alban (AT 997)
 ri Alban, .i. Cinaedh m. Duibh (AU 1005)
 Finnloech m. Ruaidhri, ri Alban (AU 1020)
 Findlaech mac Ruadrí rí Alban (LL)
 Mael Colaim mac Mael-Brighdi mac Ruaidrí, rí Alban (1029)
 Mael Coluim m. Cinaedha, ri Alban (AU 1034)
 Donnchad m. Crinan, rí Alban (AU 1040)
 Donncadh mac Crínan, aird-rí Alban (AT 1040)
 M. Beathadh m. Finnlaich airdrigh Alban (AU 1058)
 Mac Bethadh mac Findlaich, aird-rí Alban (AT 1058)
 Lulach, rí Alban (AT 1058)
 Mael Snechtai m. Lulaigh ri Muireb (AU 1085)
 Mael Coluim ri Alban (AU 1085)
 Mael Coluim m. Donnchadha airdri Alban (AU 1093)
 Mael Colaim mac Donnchadha, rí Alban (AT 1093)
 Mael Coluim mac Dondchada ri Alban (LL)
 Donnchadh m. Mael Coluim ri Alban (AU 1094)
 Domnall mac Donnchada, rí Alban (AT 1099)
 Etgair ri Alban (AU 1107)
 Alaxandair m. Mael Choluim ri Alban (AU 1124)
 Oenghus m. ingine Luluigh (ri Moréb) (AU 1130)
 Dabid, rí Alban (AT 1152)
 Dabid mac Mail Colaim, rí Alban & Saxan (AT 1153)
 Mael Coluim Cennmor, mac Eanric, ardri Alban, in cristaidhe as ferr do bai do Gaidhelaibh re muir anair (AU 1165)
 Ri Alban, Uilliam Garm (AU 1214)
 Uilliam, ri Alban (AU 1214)
 Roibert a Briuis, mormaer .. righ n-Alban (AU 1302 = 1306)
 Roberd a Briuis mormaer .. rig a nAlbain (AC 1306)
 Edubart Mor Ri Saxan & Bretan & Alban & Duice na Gascune & tigerna na hErend (AC 1307)
 Roibeat a Briuis, ri Alban (AU 1314)
 Righ Alban .i. Semus Sdibard (AC 1499)

Medieval Charter styles
The Poppleton manuscript preserves a grant supposedly made by King Nechtan to the monastery of St. Brigid at Abernethy, c. early sixth century:
Latin: 
English: 'Great Nechtan, son of Uurp, King of all the provinces of the Picts'

In the Scottish period, the charter styles vary at first, but later become more formulaic. Here are some examples from the early charter period. The Roman numeral which follows is the number given to the charter in Archibald C. Lawrie's Early Scottish Charters: Prior to A.D. 1153, (Glasgow, 1905):

  (Lawrie, V.)
 English: 'Macbeth son of Findláech and Gruoch daughter of Bodhe, King and Queen of the Scots'. Source is the Registrum of the Priory of St Andrews, and the document is a Latin translation from an earlier Gaelic document, so the  style is not reliable
  (X)
 'Malcolm by the Grace of God, High King of the Scots'
  (XVII: 1095)
 'Edgar by the Grace of God, King of the Scots'
 (XXVII)
 'Alexander by the Grace of God, King of the Scots'
  (LXIX)
 'David by the Grace of God, King of Scotland'
  (CIV)
 'David by the Grace of God, King of the Scots'

From the late Middle Ages to the Acts of Union
Similarly, the monarchs of England could be referred to as the "king of the English" as indeed Edward II of England was in the Declaration of Arbroath (1320). King of the Scots was used in "The Declaration of the Clergy in favour of Robert the Bruce" (1334), as it was in the charter by which Edward Balliol ceded the southern counties of Scotland to England. However, in many other documents King of Scotland was the preferred style, including "The Letter of the Magnates of Scotland to the King of France" (1308), "The Settlement of Succession on Robert the Bruce" (1315), the Treaty of Corbeuil (1326), the Treaty of Edinburgh–Northampton (1328), the Papal Bull authorising the anointing of Scottish Kings (1329) and the Treaty of Berwick (1357). This remained the case until the last three monarchs of Scotland, William II, Mary II and Anne, who became Queen of Great Britain following the Acts of Union 1707.

Your Grace

Scottish monarchs were addressed as "Your Grace" before the Acts of Union of 1707, when Scotland became part of the Kingdom of Great Britain. From then on, British monarchs were addressed as "Your Majesty".

Notes
, Anderson, Kings, (1973), p. 249

References
 Anderson, Marjorie O., Kings and Kingship in Early Scotland, (Edinburgh, 1973)
 Lawrie, Archibald C., Early Scottish Charters: Prior to A.D. 1153'', (Glasgow, 1905):

External links
 Annals of Tigernach
 Annals of Ulster
 Chronicon Scotorum
 Gaelic Notes on the Book of Deer

Scottish monarchy
Style of the British sovereign